Sebadoris nubilosa is a species of sea slug, a dorid nudibranch, shell-less marine gastropod mollusks in the family Discodorididae.

See also

References

Discodorididae
Gastropods described in 1871